Ingeborg is a 1960 West German comedy film directed by Wolfgang Liebeneiner and starring Ingrid Ernest, Dietmar Schönherr and Walter Giller.

Cast
 Ingrid Ernest as Ingeborg
 Dietmar Schönherr as Peter
 Walter Giller as Ottokar
 Fita Benkhoff as Tante Ottilie
 Rudolf Vogel as Herr Konjunktiv

References

Bibliography

External links 
 

1960 films
1960 comedy films
German comedy films
West German films
1960s German-language films
Films directed by Wolfgang Liebeneiner
Films based on works by Curt Goetz
German films based on plays
UFA GmbH films
1960s German films